Leon-Hendrik Fesser (born 1 September 1994) is a German footballer who plays as a centre back, most recently for SC Paderborn.

References

External links
 
 

1994 births
Living people
Sportspeople from Darmstadt
Footballers from Hesse
German footballers
Association football defenders
TSG 1899 Hoffenheim II players
FC Bayern Munich II players
SC Paderborn 07 players
Regionalliga players
3. Liga players